Archduke László Philipp Marie Vincent Ladislaus of Austria (16 July 1875 – 6 September 1895) was a member of House of Habsburg as the second son of Archduke Joseph Karl of Austria and an officer of the Austro-Hungarian Army.

Biography 
Archduke László Philipp or Lasdislaus Philipp was born on 16 July 1875 as the son of Archduke Joseph Karl of Austria. He entered the military as a Lieutenant of Ungarischen Infanterie Regiment Nr. 6. Major Heinrich Himmel von Agisburg received him as a Lieutenant. He was redeployed to  Ungarische Infanterie Regiment "Duke Joseph“ Nr. 37. 

Lasdislaus Philipp was awarded the Grand Cross of the Order of the White Eagle and became a knight of Order of the Golden Fleece. 

In 1895, Lasdislaus Philipp was accidentally shot while hunting with Stuart Marek and died on 6 September 1895 at the age of 20.

Ancestry

References 

1875 births
1895 deaths
Hungarian nobility
Hungarian-German people
House of Habsburg-Lorraine